HR.com is a social network for human resources professionals.

The majority of the content on network is user-generated, and it is designed for professionals to share best practices and research techniques.

Background
HR.com Limited is a privately held company based out of Jacksons Point, Canada. HR.com was established in 1999 by Debbie McGrath who previously also set up CEO Group Inc., later sold to the Washington Post.  It was originally set up as an online magazine for HR professionals but was subsequently turned into a social network.

HR.com has conducted industry surveys with results featured in trade publications such as CNY Business Journal, Training & Development, Canadian Manager, and Atlanta Business Chronicle.

References

Professional networks
Canadian social networking websites
Human resource management associations
1999 establishments in Canada